The rasselbock or rarely raspelbock (in America called a Jackalope) is a mythological animal, often depicted in such locations as hunting lodges. It has the head and body of a rabbit, and the antlers of a roe deer. The female counterpart of the rasselbock is the Rasselgeiß, which have smaller antlers. Some rasselbocks have been known to be shown with canine teeth, unlike other hares and rabbits. The young animals are called Waldrasslinge.

Range

Most alleged sightings are reported in the Thuringian Forest and in the Mark Brandenburg, but also in the Harz Mountains. Others are seen near Schwarzatal, the Schmücke and Auerhahn, a forest town near Stützerbach and Ilmenau. Some people claim to find footprints in the snow.

Many people say that the rasselbock is very shy and mostly stays hidden, but is dangerous due to its antlers.

The rasselbock has been shown on the money of Blankenhain in Thuringia. The town of Sitzendorf dedicated an exhibition in the steam engine museum to the Fabeltier in 1994.

Related creatures

The rasselbock is similar to the wolpertinger in Bavaria. The Hessian dilldapp and the western alpine dahu are often associated with the rasselbock, as well. The creature is most similar to the North American jackalope and Austrian rauracl.

In informal language

People often use the rasselbock in conversation to try to humiliate an older or more experienced person by rhetorically asking if they would like to go catch the creatures.

See also

Lepus cornutus
Skvader
Al-mi'raj
Jackalope
Shope papilloma virus
Taxidermy
Fearsome critters
Tall tale
Elwetritsch
Wild haggis
Wolpertinger
Lists of legendary creatures
Tree octopus
German folklore

References

Mythological rabbits and hares
Mythological hybrids
German legendary creatures